William Dysart (26 November 1929 – October 2002) was a Scottish actor, known for his role as Alec Campbell in the 1970s television series Survivors.

Dysart also appeared in Z-Cars, Randall and Hopkirk (Deceased), Doctor Who (in the serials The Highlanders, and The Ambassadors of Death) and Oil Strike North, as well as the 1969 films The Last Shot You Hear and Submarine X-1. He died in 2002 aged 72 and was cremated at East London Cemetery and Crematorium.

Filmography
 Ricochet (1963) - 1st Skater
 The Verdict (Edgar Wallace Mysteries)- (1964) - Detective Sergeant Good
 The Deadly Affair (1966) - Nobleman (uncredited)
 Submarine X-1 (1969) - Lt. Gogan R.N.R.
 The Last Shot You Hear (1969) - Peter Marriott
 The Massacre of Glencoe (1971) - Breadalbane
 Frenzy (1972) - Policeman (uncredited)
 New York Nights (1984) - Financeer (final film role)

References

External links
 

1929 births
2002 deaths
English male television actors